The President of the Republic of Trinidad and Tobago is the head of state of Trinidad and Tobago and the commander-in-chief of the Trinidad and Tobago Defence Force.  The office was established when the country became a republic in 1976, before which the head of state was the queen of Trinidad and Tobago. The last governor-general, Sir Ellis Clarke, was sworn in as the first president on 1 August 1976 under a transitional arrangement. He was formally chosen as president by an electoral college consisting of members of both houses of Parliament on 24 September 1976, which is now celebrated as Republic Day.

Under the 1976 constitution, the president is the nominal source of executive power. Like the British sovereign (and heads of state in other Westminster systems), the president "reigns but does not rule". In practice, executive authority is exercised by the prime minister and his or her cabinet, on behalf of the president. The president appoints as prime minister the leader of the largest party in the House of Representatives, and also appoints members of the Senate on the recommendation of the prime minister and the leader of the Opposition. The president must be at least 35 years old (although no president has been younger than 59), a citizen of Trinidad and Tobago, and at the time of nomination must have been resident in the country for an unbroken period of ten years. 

The president's post was one of many temporarily suspended during the Jamaat al Muslimeen coup attempt lasting from 27 July 1990 - 1 August 1990 when it resumed.

The current president of Trinidad and Tobago is Christine Kangaloo. The official residence of the president is President's House, previously known as Government House when it was used by the governors-general and governors of the islands.

Electoral method
The President of Trinidad and Tobago is indirectly elected for a 5-year term by an electoral college comprising all 41 members of the House of Representatives and all 31 members of the Senate, plus the speakers of both chambers.

To win the election a candidate must gain a plurality of votes cast, whereby a quorum comprising the Speaker of the House of Representatives, 10 Senators and 12 other member of the House of Representatives must be met for the election to be considered valid. If only one candidate should be nominated to run in the election, he or she shall be considered to have been elected president without the need for a vote to take place.

See also 
 First Lady of Trinidad and Tobago
 List of governors of Trinidad and Tobago
 List of heads of state of Trinidad and Tobago
 List of prime ministers of Trinidad and Tobago

References

External links 
 The Office of the President of the Republic of Trinidad and Tobago

 
Government of Trinidad and Tobago
1976 establishments in Trinidad and Tobago